Pseudocampylaea portosanctana is a species of air-breathing land snail, a terrestrial pulmonate gastropod mollusk in the family Geomitridae, the hairy snails and their allies. 

This species is endemic to the island of Porto Santo, Madeira archipelago, Portugal.

References 

 Bank, R. A. (2017). Classification of the Recent terrestrial Gastropoda of the World. Last update: July 16th, 2017

Molluscs of Madeira
Porto Santo Island
Geomitridae
Gastropods described in 1824
Taxa named by George Brettingham Sowerby I
Taxonomy articles created by Polbot